Orange Cove station is a former train station in Orange Cove, California.

History
The depot was built in 1913 by the Atchison, Topeka and Santa Fe Railway. It was constructed to a standard design and cost $8,000. The depot spurred nearby growth and the town of Orange Cove formed around the station. Through the 1930s, rail proved to be the premier method of freight shipment in the San Joaquin Valley.

The depot finally closed on October 14, 1977. It was listed on the National Register of Historic Places on August 29, 1978. The station building serves as Orange Cove City Hall.

References

Former Atchison, Topeka and Santa Fe Railway stations in California
Railway stations in Fresno County, California
Railway stations in the United States opened in 1913
Railway stations closed in 1977
1913 establishments in California
1977 disestablishments in California
Railway stations on the National Register of Historic Places in California
National Register of Historic Places in Fresno County, California